Prairie du Chien Municipal Airport  is a city owned public use airport located two nautical miles (4 km) southeast of the central business district of Prairie du Chien, a city in Crawford County, Wisconsin, United States. It is included in the Federal Aviation Administration (FAA) National Plan of Integrated Airport Systems for 2021–2025, in which it is categorized as a basic general aviation facility.

Although most U.S. airports use the same three-letter location identifier for the FAA and IATA, this airport is assigned PDC by the FAA and PCD by the IATA (which assigned PDC to Mueo, New Caledonia).

Facilities and aircraft
It has two asphalt paved runways: 14/32 is 5,000 by 75 feet (1,524 x 23 m); 11/29 is 3,999 by 75 feet (1,219 x 23 m). 

For the 12-month period ending August 8, 2022, the airport had 12,300 aircraft operations, an average of 34 per day: 96% general aviation, 4% air taxi and less than 1% military. In January 2023, there were 15 aircraft based at this airport: 13 single-engine, 1 multi-engine and 1 jet.

See also
List of airports in Wisconsin

References

External links
 Prairie du Chien Municipal Airport at Wisconsin DOT Airport Directory
 

Airports in Wisconsin
Buildings and structures in Crawford County, Wisconsin